The Control is a 2018 sci-fi mystery thriller film by Mike Stasko and Eric Schiller. The film premiered at the 2018 WorldFest-Houston International Film Festival, where it won the Platinum Remi award.

References

External links
 

2018 films
English-language Canadian films
2010s science fiction thriller films
Canadian science fiction thriller films
2010s English-language films
2010s Canadian films